Dicking may refer to:
Derkacze, a village in Lubusz Voivodeship, western Poland
Derkacz, a settlement in West Pomeranian Voivodeship, northwestern Poland

See also
Dick (disambiguation)
Dickin, an English and Irish surname
Docking (disambiguation)
Ducking, an audio effect